Thermichthys hollisi is a species of viviparous brotula found in the Galapagos Rift Zone at depths of  around thermal vents.  This species is the only known member of its genus. The specific name honours the submersible pilot Raplph Hollis who captured specimens of this fish.

References

Bythitidae
Monotypic fish genera
Fish described in 1990